Vysokohirne is a place name which can refer to:
 Vysokohirne, Yalta Municipality, Crimea
 Vysokohirne, Zaporizhzhia Raion, Zaporizhzhia Oblast, Ukraine